La Estrella is a corregimiento in Bugaba District, Chiriquí Province, Panama. Its population as of 1990 was 3,721; its population as of 2000 was 4,433.

References

Corregimientos of Chiriquí Province